The 27th Cannes Film Festival was held from 9 to 24 May 1974. The Grand Prix du Festival International du Film went to The Conversation by Francis Ford Coppola.

The festival opened with Amarcord, directed by Federico Fellini and closed with S*P*Y*S, directed by Irvin Kershner.

Jury 
The following people were appointed as the Jury of the 1974 feature film competition:

Feature films
René Clair (France) Jury President
Jean-Loup Dabadie (France)
Kenne Fant (Sweden)
Félix Labisse (France)
Irwin Shaw (USA)
Michel Soutter (Switzerland)
Monica Vitti (Italy)
Alexander Walker (UK)
Rostislav Yurenev (Soviet Union)

Official selection

In competition - Feature film
The following feature films competed for the Grand Prix International du Festival:

Ali: Fear Eats the Soul (Angst essen Seele auf) by Rainer Werner Fassbinder
Arabian Nights (Il fiore delle Mille e una notte) by Pier Paolo Pasolini
The Bear Cage (La cage aux ours) by Marian Handwerker
Cats' Play (Macskajáték) by Károly Makk
The Conversation by Francis Ford Coppola
Daughters, Daughters (Abu el-Banat) by Moshé Mizrahi
Garam Hawa by M. S. Sathyu
Himiko by Masahiro Shinoda
The Holy Office (El santo oficio) by Arturo Ripstein
Hopelessly Lost (Sovsem propashchiy) by Georgi Daneliya
The Hour of Liberation Has Arrived (Saat el Fahrir Dakkat, Barra ya Isti Mar) by Heiny Srour
The Last Detail by Hal Ashby
The Last Word (Poslednata duma) by Binka Zhelyazkova
Mahler by Ken Russell
Milarepa by Liliana Cavani
The Nickel Ride by Robert Mulligan
The Nine Lives of Fritz the Cat by Robert Taylor
Once Upon a Time in the East (Il était une fois dans l'est) by André Brassard
The Others (Les autres) by Hugo Santiago
La prima Angélica by Carlos Saura
Somewhere Beyond Love (Delitto d'amore) by Luigi Comencini
Stavisky by Alain Resnais
The Sugarland Express by Steven Spielberg
Symptoms by José Ramón Larraz
Thieves Like Us by Robert Altman
Violins at the Ball (Les violons du bal) by Michel Drach

Films out of competition
The following films were selected to be screened out of competition:

 1789 by Ariane Mnouchkine
 Amarcord by Federico Fellini
 And Now My Love (Toute une vie) by Claude Lelouch
 Birds Do It, Bees Do It by Nicolas Noxon, Irwin Rosten
 Entr'acte by René Clair
 The Homecoming by Peter Hall
 The Grand Maneuver (Les Grandes Manoeuvres) by René Clair
 Henry Miller, Poète Maudit by Michèle Arnault
 Lancelot du Lac by Robert Bresson
 Once by Mort Heilig
 Parade by Jacques Tati
 Picasso, L'Homme et Son Oeuvre by Edward Quinn
 S*P*Y*S by Irvin Kershner
 Le Trio Infernal by Francis Girod

Short film competition
The following short films competed for the Short Film Palme d'Or:

Akvarium  by Zdenka Doitcheva
Another Saturday Night by Steven B. Poster, Mik Derks
Carnet trouvé chez les fourmis by Georges Senechal
Hunger by Peter Foldes
I stała się światłość by Jerzy Kalina
Jocselekedetek by Béla Vajda
Leonarduv denik by Jan Švankmajer
O sidarta by Michel Jakar
Ostrov (Island) by Fyodor Khitruk

Parallel sections

International Critics' Week
The following feature films were screened for the 13th International Critics' Week (13e Semaine de la Critique):

 A Bigger Splash by Jack Hazan (United Kingdom)
 Na wylot by Grzegorz Królikiewicz (Poland)
 The Spirit of the Beehive (El espíritu de la colmena) by Víctor Erice (Spain)
 Hearts and Minds by Peter Davis (United States)
 The Hour of Liberation Has Arrived (L’heure de la libération a sonné) by Heiny Srour (Lebanon)
 I.F.Stone’s Weekly by Jerry Bruck Jr (United States)
 La Paloma by Daniel Schmid (Switzerland)
 La Tierra prometida by Miguel Littín (Chile)
 Der Tod des Flohzirkusdirektos by Thomas Koerfer (Switzerland)

Directors' Fortnight
The following films were screened for the 1974 Directors' Fortnight (Quinzaine des Réalizateurs):

 A Noite Do Espantalho by Sergio Ricardo (Brazil)
 A Rainha Diaba by Antonio Carlos Fontura (Brazil)
 Au-delà des sables by Radu Gabrea (Romania)
 Celine and Julie Go Boating (Céline et Julie vont en bateau) by Jacques Rivette (France)
 Contra la Razon y por la Fuerza (doc.) by Carlos Ortiz Tejeda (Mexico)
 La Coupe à 10 francs by Philippe Condroyer (France)
 Erica Minor by Bertrand Van Effenterre (Switzerland)
 The Expropriation (La expropiación) by Raúl Ruiz (Chile)
 The Extradition (Die Auslieferung) by Peter von Gunten (Switzerland)
 Gelegenheitsarbeit einer Sklavin by Alexander Kluge (West Germany)
 Hay Que Matar Al General by Enrique Urteaga (Chile)
 Il pleut toujours où c'est mouillé by Jean-Daniel Simon (France)
 Lars Ole, 5C by Nils Malmros (Denmark)
 The Last Betrothal (Les Dernières Fiançailles) by Jean Pierre Lefebvre (Canada)
 Let Mrtve Ptice by Živojin Pavlović (Yugoslavia)
 Manifest by Antonis Lepeniotis (Austria)
 Mean Streets by Martin Scorsese (United States)
 The Migrants by Tom Gries (United States)
 Morel's Invention (L'invenzione di Morel) by Emidio Greco (Italy)
 Once Upon a Time There Was a Singing Blackbird (Iko shashvi mgalobeli) by Otar Iosseliani (Soviet Union)
 Padatik by Mrinal Sen (India)
 Processo Per Direttisima by Lucio De Caro (Italy)
 The Profiteer (Il Saprofita) by Sergio Nasca (Italy)
 Sweet Movie by Dušan Makavejev (Canada, France, West Germany)
 Uira by Gustavo Dahl (Brazil)
 Vai Travalhar Vagabundo by Hugo Carvanna (Brazil)
 La Vérité sur l'imaginaire passion d'un inconnu by Marcel Hanoun (France)

Short films

 L'Agression by Frank Cassenti (France)
 Au nom de Jésus by José Rodrigues Dos Santos, Gérard Loubeau (Ivory Coast)
 Brainwash by Ronald Bijlsma (Netherlands)
 Film sur Hans Bellmeer by Catherine Binet (France)
 Liberté-Jean by Jean-Michel Carré (France)
 Une puce sur un no man's land by Marie-France Molle (France)
 Stillborn by Ladd Mc Portlan] (United States)
 Winda by Jerzy Kucia (Poland)

Awards

Official awards
The following films and people received the 1974 Official selection awards:
Grand Prix du Festival International du Film: The Conversation by Francis Ford Coppola
Grand Prix Spécial du Jury: Il fiore delle Mille e una notte by Pier Paolo Pasolini
Best Screenplay: Hal Barwood, Matthew Robbins and Steven Spielberg for The Sugarland Express
Best Actress: Marie-José Nat for Les violons du bal
Best Actor: Jack Nicholson for The Last Detail
Short films
Grand Prix International du Festival: Ostrov by Fyodor Khitruk
 Jury Prize: Hunger by Peter Foldes

Independent awards
FIPRESCI
 FIPRESCI Prize:
 Ali: Fear Eats the Soul (Angst essen Seele auf) by Rainer Werner Fassbinder (In competition)
 Lancelot du Lac by Robert Bresson (declined) (Out of competition)
Commission Supérieure Technique
Technical Grand Prize: Mahler by Ken Russell
Ecumenical Jury
 Prize of the Ecumenical Jury: Angst essen Seele auf by Rainer Werner Fassbinder
 Ecumenical Jury - Special Mention: The Conversation by Francis Ford Coppola

References

Media
INA: Opening of the 1974 Festival (commentary in French)

External links 
1974 Cannes Film Festival (web.archive)
Official website Retrospective 1974
Cannes Film Festival Awards for 1974 at Internet Movie Database

Cannes Film Festival, 1974
Cannes Film Festival, 1974
Cannes Film Festival